There are at least 29 named lakes and reservoirs in Pondera County, Montana.

Lakes
 Abbott Lake, el. 
 Alkali Lake, el. 
 Blue Lake, el. 
 Cody Lake, el. 
 Deep Lake, el. 
 Emerald Lake, el. 
 Eyraud Lakes, el. 
 Fish Lake, el. 
 Green Lake, el. 
 Heron Lake, el. 
 Hidden Lake, el. 
 Horn Lake, el. 
 Howes Lakes, el. 
 Kiyo Crag Lake, el. 
 Letz Lake, el. 
 Mitten Lake, el. 
 Round Lake, el. 
 Slippery Hoof Lake, el. 
 Stetler Lakes, el. 
 Twin Lakes, el. 
 Waddel Lakes, el.

Reservoirs
 Conrad Reservoir, el. 
 Fowler Reservoir, el. 
 Fowler Reservoir, el. 
 Green Lake, el. 
 Lake Frances, el. 
 Swift Reservoir, el. 
 Tedson Reservoir, el.

See also
 List of lakes in Montana

Notes

Bodies of water of Pondera County, Montana
Pondera